Malgorzata Lawrynowicz (born  in Wejherowo) is a Polish group rhythmic gymnast representing her nation at international competitions.  

She participated at the 2004 Summer Olympics in the all-around event together with Justyna Banasiak, Martyna Dąbkowska, Alexandra Wójcik, Anna Mrozińska and Aleksandra Zawistowska finishing 10th.
She competed at world championships, including at the 2005 and 2007  World Rhythmic Gymnastics Championships.

References

External links

http://www.gymmedia.com/Baku05/nations_partic.pdf
https://www.youtube.com/watch?v=MQz-WQzzoyA

1988 births
Living people
Polish rhythmic gymnasts
People from Wejherowo
Sportspeople from Pomeranian Voivodeship
Olympic gymnasts of Poland
Gymnasts at the 2004 Summer Olympics